Roger Vanden Stock (born 13 August 1942) is the former president of Anderlecht, a Belgian football club, a post he has held between 1996 and 2018.

References

Living people
1942 births
Place of birth missing (living people)
R.S.C. Anderlecht non-playing staff